Khashaba Dadasaheb Jadhav,  (15 January 1926 – 14 August 1984) was an Indian freestyle wrestler. Best known for winning bronze medal at the 1952 Summer Olympics in Helsinki. He was the first athlete from independent India to win an individual medal in the Olympics.

After Norman Pritchard who won two silver medals in athletics in 1900 under colonial India, Khashaba was the first individual athlete from independent India to win a medal at the Olympics. In the years before Khashaba, India would only win gold medals in field hockey, a team sport. He is the only Indian Olympic medalist who never received a Padma Award. Khashaba was extremely nimble on his feet, which made him different from other wrestlers of his time. English coach Rees Gardner saw this trait in him and trained him prior to the 1948 Olympic games. He belonged to Goleshwar village near Karad.
He was posthumously awarded Arjuna Award in 2000 for his contribution to wrestling.

Childhood 
Born in a village called Goleshwar in Karad taluka of District Satara in Maharashtra State, KD Jadhav was the youngest of five sons of a renowned wrestler Dadasaheb Jadhav. He did his schooling in Tilak High School in Karad taluka of Satara district between 1940–1947. He grew up in a household that lived and breathed wrestling. He participated in the Quit India Movement providing shelter and a hiding place to the revolutionaries, circulating letters  against the British were some of his contributions to the movement. He resolved to unfurl the tricolor flag in Olympics on Independence Day 15 August 1947.

Wrestling career 
His father Dadasaheb was a wrestling coach and he initiated Khashaba into wrestling at the age of five. His wrestling mentors in college were Baburao Balawde and Belapuri Guruji. His success in wrestling did not avoid him from getting good grades. He participated in quit India movement.He resolved to unfurl the tri-color flag in Olympics on Independence Day 15 August 1947.

Starting his wrestling career in 1948, he first came into lime-light at the 1948 London Olympics when he finished 6th in the flyweight category. He was the first Indian to achieve such a high a position in the individual category until 1948. Despite being new to wrestling on a mat as well as the international rules of wrestling, Jadhav’s 6th-place finish was no mean feat at that time.

For the next four years, Jadhav trained even harder for the Helsinki Olympics where he moved up one weight category and participated in the bantamweight category (57 kg) which saw wrestlers from twenty-four different countries. He went on to defeat wrestlers from countries like Mexico, Germany and Canada, before losing his semi-final bout, but he came back stronger to win the bronze medal which made him the first ever individual Olympic medalist of independent India.

1948 Summer Olympics
Jadhav's first feel of the big stage was at the 1948 London Olympics; his journey was funded by the Maharaja of Kolhapur. During his stay in London, he was trained by Rees Gardner, a former lightweight World champion from the United States. It was Gardner's guidance that saw Jadhav finish sixth in the flyweight section, despite being unfamiliar with wrestling on the mat. He stunned the audience by defeating the  Australian wrestler Bert Harris in the first few minutes of the bout. He went on to defeat Billy Jernigan of the US, but lost to Mansour Raeisi of Iran, to be eliminated from the Games.

!  Res.
!  Opponent
!  Score
!  Date
!  Event
!  Location
!  Notes
|-
|Win
|align=left| Bert Harris
|style="font-size:88%"|3–0
|style="font-size:88%"|29 July
|style="font-size:88%"|1948 Summer Olympics Men's Flyweight, Freestyle
|style="text-align:left;font-size:88%;"| London
|style="text-align:left;font-size:88%;"|Rank 2T

|-
|Win
|align=left| Billy Jernigan
|style="font-size:88%"|3–0
|style="font-size:88%"|30 July
|style="font-size:88%"|1948 Summer Olympics Men's Flyweight, Freestyle
|style="text-align:left;font-size:88%;"| London
|style="text-align:left;font-size:88%;"|Rank 3
|-
|Loss
|align=left| Mansour Raeisi
|style="font-size:88%"|Tech. Fall; 5:31
|style="font-size:88%"|30 July
|style="font-size:88%"|1948 Summer Olympics Men's Flyweight, Freestyle
|style="text-align:left;font-size:88%;"| London
|style="text-align:left;font-size:88%;"|Rank 6 (Eliminated)
|-

Aftermath 
For the next four years, Jadhav trained even harder for the Helsinki Olympics where he moved up in weight and participated in the 125 lb bantamweight category which saw wrestlers from twenty-four countries, he increased the tempo of his preparation for the next Olympics in Helsinki.

1952 Summer Olympics
After the marathon bout, he was asked to fight Soviet Union's Rashid Mammadbeyov. As per the rules a rest of at least 30 minutes were required between bouts, but no Indian official was available to press his case, a tired Jadhav, failed to inspire and Mammadbeyov cashed in on the chance to reach the final. Defeating the wrestlers from Canada, Mexico and Germany, he won bronze medal on 23 July 1952 thereby creating history by becoming Independent India's  first individual medal winner. Khashaba's colleague, Krishnarao  Mangave a wrestler, also participated in the same Olympics in another category but missed the bronze medal by just one point.

!  Res.
!  Opponent
!  Score
!  Date
!  Event
!  Location
!  Notes
|-
|Win
|align=left| Adrien Poliquin
|style="font-size:88%"|Tech. Fall; 14:25
|style="font-size:88%"|1952-07-20
|style="font-size:88%"|1952 Summer Olympics Men's Bantamweight, Freestyle
|style="text-align:left;font-size:88%;"| Helsinki
|style="text-align:left;font-size:88%;"|Rank 1T

|-
|Win
|align=left| Leonardo Basurto
|style="font-size:88%"|Tech. Fall; 5:20
|style="font-size:88%"|1952-07-20
|style="font-size:88%"|1952 Summer Olympics Men's Bantamweight, Freestyle
|style="text-align:left;font-size:88%;"| Helsinki
|style="text-align:left;font-size:88%;"|Rank 1T
|-
|Win
|align=left| Ferdinand Schmitz
|style="font-size:88%"|2-1
|style="font-size:88%"|1952-07-20
|style="font-size:88%"|1952 Summer Olympics Men's Bantamweight, Freestyle
|style="text-align:left;font-size:88%;"| Helsinki
|style="text-align:left;font-size:88%;"|Rank 2T
|-
|Loss
|align=left| Rashid Mammadbeyov
|style="font-size:88%"|3-0
|style="font-size:88%"|1952-07-20
|style="font-size:88%"|1952 Summer Olympics Men's Bantamweight, Freestyle
|style="text-align:left;font-size:88%;"| Helsinki
|style="text-align:left;font-size:88%;"|Rank 1T
|-
|Loss
|align=left| Shohachi Ishii
|style="font-size:88%"|3-0
|style="font-size:88%"|1952-07-20
|style="font-size:88%"|1952 Summer Olympics Men's Bantamweight, Freestyle
|style="text-align:left;font-size:88%;"| Helsinki
|style="text-align:left;font-size:88%;"|Rank 3 Bronze Medal
|-

Return from the 1952 Summer Olympics 
Although India's hockey team bagged a gold at the Helsinki games, Jadhav was the primary attraction of India's contingent that returned home after the Olympics. Crowd gathered at the Karad Railway Station to welcome their hero, a cavalcade of 151 bullock carts and dhols, carried their hero for about 10 km and passed through the village of Goleshwar.

Later life and death 
In 1955, he joined the police force as a sub-inspector where he won several competitions held within the Police department and also performed National duties as a sports instructor. Despite serving the police department for twenty-seven years and retiring as an Asst. Police Commissioner, Jadhav had to fight for pension later on in his life. For years, he was neglected by the sports federation and had to live the final stages of his life in poverty. He died in a road accident in 1984, his wife struggled to get any assistance from any quarter.

Awards and honours 

 He was honoured by making him a part of the torch run at the 1982 Asian Games in Delhi
 The Maharashtra  Government awarded the Chhatrapati Puraskar posthumously in 1992-1993.
 He was posthumously honoured with the Arjuna Award in 2000.
 The newly built wrestling venue for the 2010 Delhi Commonwealth Games was named after him to honour his achievement.
 On 15 January 2023, Google honoured Jadhav with a Google Doodle on his 97th birth anniversary.

Legacy

Book 
Olympic veer K D Jadhav by Sanjay Dudhane, National Book Trust.

Movie 
International Wrestler and now producer Sangram Singh is all set with his plans of producing a film on Jadhav after taking the rights from his son Ranjit Jadhav. The film will be based on the life of a wrestler Khashaba Jadhav, who won independent India's first Olympic medal in 1952. Jadhav has been an idol of Sangram since his childhood and Sangram wants to give his Shradhanjali now to his idol by making a film on him.
Confirming the news through an official statement about the sportsman, Sangram  says, "He has quite a noteworthy journey and earned our country its first international medal but in time, his name and story was something that was lost. He is a hero who deserves to be remembered and honoured. We will work hard to do justice to the portrayal of his achievements."
The script for the film is currently being worked upon.

Related pages
 Sports in India
 India at the Olympics

References

External links
 

1926 births
1984 deaths
Olympic wrestlers of India
Wrestlers at the 1948 Summer Olympics
Wrestlers at the 1952 Summer Olympics
Indian male sport wrestlers
Olympic bronze medalists for India
Road incident deaths in India
People from Maharashtra
Recipients of the Arjuna Award
People from Karad
Marathi people
Olympic medalists in wrestling
Marathi sportspeople
Medalists at the 1952 Summer Olympics